Brandon Joyce (September 5, 1984 – December 28, 2010) was a gridiron football offensive tackle.   He was the son of former NFL punter Terry Joyce.

Brandon Joyce was signed by the Minnesota Vikings as an undrafted free agent in 2008. He played college football at Illinois State.  Joyce had also been a member of the Toronto Argonauts, Las Vegas Locomotives and St. Louis Rams.  Joyce was shot during a robbery on December 24, 2010, and died in St. Charles, Missouri, at age 26, after several days on a life support machine.

References

External links
Illinois State Redbirds bio
Brandon Joyce's obituary

1984 births
2010 deaths
Players of American football from St. Louis
Players of Canadian football from St. Louis
American football offensive tackles
American players of Canadian football
Canadian football offensive linemen
Indiana Hoosiers football players
Illinois State Redbirds football players
Minnesota Vikings players
Toronto Argonauts players
Las Vegas Locomotives players
St. Louis Rams players
People murdered in Missouri
Deaths by firearm in Missouri
Male murder victims
American murder victims